"Lonely Christmas" is a song by American singer Bryson Tiller featuring Canadian singer Justin Bieber and fellow American singer Poo Bear, who produced it with the Audibles and Sasha Sirota. It was released through RCA Records on November 19, 2021, as the lead single from Tiller's debut extended play, A Different Christmas.

Charts

Release history

References

2021 singles
2021 songs
Bryson Tiller songs
Justin Bieber songs
Songs written by Bryson Tiller
Songs written by Justin Bieber
Songs written by Poo Bear
Songs written by Dominic Jordan
Songs written by Sasha Sirota
Song recordings produced by the Audibles
RCA Records singles